Peter John Jarrold ,  (born April 1933) was a British businessman who was managing director of The Jarrold Group and was High Sheriff of Norwich.

Personal life 
He was born in Norwich and educated at Town Close School and Oundle School

Career 
He became managing director of Jarrold in 1979 and Sheriff of Norwich in 1999  He was also Vice President of Age UK and a Deputy Lieutenant for Norfolk.

References

External links 
https://printbusiness.co.uk/peter-jarrold-dies-after-long-illness/

People from Norwich
Alumni of Queens' College, Cambridge
People educated at Oundle School
1933 births
2019 deaths
20th-century English businesspeople
Deputy Lieutenants of Norfolk
People educated at Town Close School